Mundiwindi is a ghost town in the Pilbara region of Western Australia.

The town was established in 1914 as a telegraph station. The station was closed in 1977. The telegraph station was a link on the Australian Overland Telegraph Line linking the settled regions of Australia to the submarine cable at Broome. A weather station operated at the site between 1915 and 1981.

The town housed employees of the Postmaster-General's Department responsible for the maintenance of the station, and their families. The only buildings on site were "the Post Office, an engine room, a trunkline equipment building, a pump house (good quality water came from a bore) and a line depot". The "town" was never a large one.

In 1973 the town was hit by Tropical Cyclone Kerry, causing some damage to buildings.

The site is now deserted and the buildings are in ruins.

References

External links

There once was a town called Mundiwindi ...
The search for Mundiwindi

Ghost towns in Western Australia
Pilbara